Amazing Adult Fantasy, retitled Amazing Fantasy in its final issue, is an American superhero comic book anthology series published by Marvel Comics from 1961 through 1962, with the latter title revived with superhero features in 1995 and in the 2000s. The final 1960s issue, Amazing Fantasy #15 (cover-dated Aug. 1962), introduced the popular Marvel superhero Spider-Man. Amazing Adult Fantasy premiered with issue #7, taking over the numbering from Amazing Adventures.

Publication history

The science fiction-fantasy anthology Amazing Adult Fantasy began with issue #7 (cover-dated Dec. 1961), having taken over the number of the similar anthology Amazing Adventures. The earlier issues before the title change featured stories drawn by a number of artists including Jack Kirby, Don Heck and Steve Ditko. Amazing Adult Fantasy featured exclusively the quick, quirky, twist-ending tales of artist Ditko and writer-editor Stan Lee that had appeared in Amazing Adventures and sister titles primarily featuring rampaging monsters. The cover of the comic carried the motto "The magazine that respects your intelligence".

Lee in 2009 described these "short, five-page filler strips that Steve and I did together", originally "placed in any of our comics that had a few extra pages to fill", as "odd fantasy tales that I'd dream up with O. Henry-type [twist] endings". Giving an early example of what would later be known as the "Marvel Method" of writer-artist collaboration, Lee said: "All I had to do was give Steve a one-line description of the plot and he'd be off and running. He'd take those skeleton outlines I had given him and turn them into classic little works of art that ended up being far cooler than I had any right to expect".

With issue #15 (Aug. 1962) Amazing Adult Fantasy was retitled Amazing Fantasy. This issue's lead feature introduced the superhero Spider-Man, written by Lee and drawn by Ditko, although Lee rejected Ditko's cover art and commissioned Jack Kirby to pencil a cover that Ditko inked. As Lee explained in 2010: "I think I had Jack sketch out a cover for it because I always had a lot of confidence in Jack's covers". In numerous interviews Lee has recalled how the title had been slated for cancellation, and so with nothing to lose, publisher Martin Goodman reluctantly agreed to allow him to introduce Spider-Man, a new kind of superhero – one who would be a teenager, but not a sidekick, and one who would have everyman doubts, neuroses and money problems. However, while this was indeed the final issue, its editorial page anticipated the comic continuing and that "the Spiderman [sic] ... will appear every month in Amazing".

Regardless, sales for Amazing Fantasy #15 proved to be one of Marvel's highest at the time, so the company launched the series The Amazing Spider-Man seven months later.

The DVD release of the collector's edition of the Spider-Man film included a copy of Amazing Fantasy #15. In 2001, Marvel published the 10-issue historical overview  The 100 Greatest Marvels of All Time, with Amazing Fantasy #15 topping the list.

In 2008, an anonymous donor bequeathed the Library of Congress the original 24 pages of Ditko art for Amazing Fantasy #15, including Spider-Man's debut and the stories "The Bell-Ringer", "Man in the Mummy Case", and "There Are Martians Among Us".

Continuation in 1995
For decades, no attempts were made to relaunch the title or to continue it with an issue #16. However, in 1995, Marvel editor Danny Fingeroth decided a story gap existed between Amazing Fantasy #15 and The Amazing Spider-Man #1. In an attempt to fill that gap, Marvel published three Spider-Man flashback stories in Amazing Fantasy #16–18 (Dec. 1995 – March 1996), each written by Kurt Busiek and painted chiefly by Paul Lee.

Volume 2

The second volume of the series ran 20 issues (cover-dated Aug. 2004 – June 2006).

The first arc ran through (vol. 2) #1–6 and featured a new teenaged heroine, Araña. The second arc, in (vol. 2) #7–12, published after a short hiatus, featured a revamped, female version of the supervillain the Scorpion. A back-up feature in (vol. 2) #10–12 (Sept.-Nov. 2005) starred the character Nina Price, the Vampire by Night, and (vol. 2) #13–14 (both Dec. 2005) led with the modern-West feature "Vegas", backed up by "Captain Universe". In an attempt to replicate history, Marvel announced that the new issue #15 would introduce a new generation of heroes in a 48-page standalone issue, in the hopes that they would become as popular as Spider-Man. These heroes included Mastermind Excello, Blackjack, the Great Video, Monstro, the Heartbreak Kid, and Positron. The cover to #15 was a revamped version of the original Amazing Fantasy #15 cover, complete with Spider-Man swinging through a modern-day New York City, while the new heroes watch in awe in the background.

The final arc, in (vol. 2) #16–20 (Feb.-June 2006), introduced Death's Head 3.0, a revamp of the Marvel UK character, written by the original version's creator, Simon Furman. Issues #18–19 contain two "Tales of the New Universe" stories as backup features, while #20 featured a Western backup, "Steamrider".

Volume 3 
The third volume ran for five issues (cover dated September 2021 - February 2022). Written and drawn by Kaare Andrews, it follows numerous characters who wake up on a mysterious island with no memory of how they arrived.

Collected editions

Volume 1 

Amazing Fantasy #15 has been reprinted many times, sometimes just reprinting the Spider-Man story.

Volume 2

Volume 3

Sales of Amazing Fantasy (vol. 1) #15
 In September 2000, Metropolis Comics in New York City brought the only known CGC-graded 9.6 (near-mint plus) copy to market and sold it for $140,000.
 In October 2007, a near-mint copy sold for $210,000 in an online auction on ComicLink.com and in 2017 a NM- 9.2 sold on ComicLink.com for $460,000.
 Price results accelerated leading up to the Spider-Man: Homecoming film and a CGC 8.0 sold for three times the price it has ever sold for before when it hit $261,000 in a ComicLink.com auction in May 2017.
 A near-mint CGC-graded 9.6 copy sold for $1.1 million to an unnamed collector on March 7, 2011, making the issue one of only three comic books to have broken the million-dollar mark (the others being the debut of Superman in Action Comics #1, of which three copies have sold for more than $1 million each; and the first appearance of Batman in Detective Comics #27).
 In June 2015, a record price of $200,000 was paid for an example of Amazing Fantasy #15 in CGC 9.0 condition on ComicLink.com.
 In September 2021, a CGC NM+ 9.6 copy sold at auction for $3,600,000.

See also
With great power comes great responsibility

References

Further reading
 Lee, Stan. Origins of Marvel Comics (Marvel Entertainment Group reissue, 1997) 
 Lee, Stan, and George Mair. Excelsior!: The Amazing Life of Stan Lee (Fireside, 2002) 
 Raphael, Jordan and Tom Spurgeon. Stan Lee and the Rise and Fall of the American Comic Book (Chicago Review Press, 2003)

External links
 Comics: Spider-Man at Marvel.com
 Archive of McQuarrie, Jim, "Amazing Adult Fantasy No. 9", "Oddball Comics" (column), #1151, April 9, 2007
A review of Amazing Fantasy #15

1961 comics debuts
1962 comics endings
1995 comics debuts
1996 comics endings
2004 comics debuts
2006 comics endings
2021 comics debuts
2022 comics endings
Fantasy comics
Atlas Comics titles
Spider-Man titles
Comics by Kurt Busiek
Comics by Steve Ditko
Comics anthologies